Poliopastea cyllarus is a moth of the family Erebidae. It is found in Panama, Colombia and Pará, Brazil.

References

Poliopastea
Moths described in 1896